Anarthria is a genus of flowering plant species endemic to Southwest Australia. The name of the genus is derived from Ancient Greek, meaning 'without joints'.

 Species

References

Poales genera
Endemic flora of Southwest Australia
Restionaceae